The Women's shot put F42-46 event for amputee athletes was held at the 2004 Summer Paralympics in the Athens Olympic Stadium on 25 September. It was won by Zheng Bao Zhu, representing .

27 Sept. 2004, 10:45

References

W
2004 in women's athletics